El Salam Maritime Transport is an Egyptian ferry operator that operates a fleet of fifteen vessels on Red Sea routes between ports in Egypt, Saudi Arabia and Jordan. The company transports over one million passengers a year and is the largest private shipping company in the Middle East.

This ship, among others in the same class, were supposed to end their career in 2010, but after the Boccaccio 98 disaster all remaining (3) vessels were sold to an Indian scrapyard (one other had burned out and sank already in 2002).

Routes operated
 Suez, Egypt — Jeddah, Saudi Arabia
 Safaga, Egypt — Duba and Jeddah, both in Saudi Arabia
 Nuweiba, Egypt — Aqaba, Jordan
 Hurghada, Egypt — Duba, Saudi Arabia

References

External links
 El Salam Maritime Transport official website
 El Salam Group
 International Maritime Organization

Ferry companies of Egypt
Transport organisations based in Egypt